Paria is a village situated near Vapi in Valsad district, Gujarat, India.

Paria is under the Jyoti-Gram project of the Gujarat government.

Villages in Valsad district